Nepal competed at the 2012 Winter Youth Olympics in Innsbruck, Austria. The Nepali team was made up of one athlete, an alpine skier.

Alpine skiing

Nepal qualified one boy in alpine skiing.

Boy

See also
Nepal at the 2012 Summer Olympics

References

Nations at the 2012 Winter Youth Olympics
2012 in Nepalese sport
Nepal at the Youth Olympics